Ichiyanagi (written: 一柳 lit. "one willow") is a Japanese surname. Notable people with the surname include:

, Japanese candy sculpture artist
, Japanese composer
, Japanese footballer

Japanese-language surnames